International Journal of Molecular Medicine is a peer reviewed academic journal published by Spandidos Publications.

In 2019 it had an impact factor of 3.098.

Abstracting and indexing 
The journal is indexed and/or abstracted in:

References

External links 
 

General medical journals
English-language journals
Spandidos Publications academic journals
Publications established in 1998
Monthly journals